John Edward Sawyer (May 5, 1917 – February 7, 1995) was a prominent academic and philanthropic administrator. He was educated at Worcester Academy and then Deerfield Academy, Williams College, and Harvard University. He served as the 11th president of Williams College, and headed the Andrew W. Mellon Foundation. He was a member of the American Academy of Arts and Sciences, the American Philosophical Society, and the National Academy of Sciences. In 1988 Sawyer was awarded the Public Welfare Medal from the National Academy of Sciences.

References

External links
Williams College biography
Williams College President 1961-1973 at Williams College Special Collections
John E. Sawyer Papers at Williams College Archives & Special Collections

Andrew W. Mellon Foundation
Williams College alumni
Worcester Academy alumni
Deerfield Academy alumni
Harvard University alumni
Presidents of Williams College
1917 births
1995 deaths
Members of the American Philosophical Society
20th-century American academics